The 2016 cricket season was the 117th in which the County Championship has been an official competition. The season began in March with a round of university matches, and continued until the conclusion of a round of County Championship matches in late September. Three major men's domestic competitions were contested: the 2016 County Championship, the 2016 Royal London One-Day Cup and the 2016 NatWest t20 Blast. Women's domestic cricket saw the launch of the Women's Cricket Super League, a new franchise competition, and the contesting of the Women's County Championship and Women's Twenty20 Cup.

During the season, two men's Test teams toured England. Sri Lanka competed early in the summer, with Pakistan also touring later in the year. Pakistan Women also toured, playing England in three WODIs and three WT20Is.

Roll of honour
Test series
 England v Sri Lanka: 3 Tests - England won 2–0
 England v Pakistan: 4 Tests - Series drawn 2–2

ODI series
 England v Sri Lanka: 5 ODIs - England won 3–0
 England v Pakistan: 5 ODIs - England won 4–1

Twenty20 International series
 England v Sri Lanka: Only T20I - England won by 8 wickets
 England v Pakistan: Only T20I - Pakistan won by 9 wickets

WODI series
 England v Pakistan: 3 WODIs - England won 3–0

Women's Twenty20 International series
 England v Pakistan: 3 WT20Is - England won 3–0

County Championship
 Division One winners: Middlesex
 Division One runners-up: Somerset
 Division Two winners: Essex
 Relegated from Division One: Durham and Nottinghamshire
 Promoted from Division Two: Essex

Royal London One-Day Cup
 Winners: Warwickshire
 Runners-up: Surrey

NatWest t20 Blast
 Winners: Northamptonshire Steelbacks
 Runners-up: Durham Jets

Minor Counties Cricket Championship 
 Winners: Berkshire
 Runners-up: Lincolnshire

MCCA Knockout Trophy
 Winners: Herefordshire
 Runners-up: Staffordshire

Women's County Championship
 Winners: Kent
 Runners-up: Sussex

Women's Twenty20 Cup
 Winners: Kent
 Runners-up: Warwickshire

Women's Cricket Super League
 Winners: Southern Vipers
 Runners-up: Western Storm

Wisden Cricketers of the Year (i.e., awarded in 2016 for the 2015 season)
 Jonny Bairstow, Brendon McCullum, Steve Smith, Ben Stokes, Kane Williamson

PCA Player of the Year
 Ben Duckett

County Championship

Royal London One-Day Cup

NatWest t20 Blast

Minor Counties Championship

Women's County Championship

Kent won the 2016 Women's County Championship, the county's record seventh Championship title. The runners-up were Sussex.

Women's Twenty20 Cup

Kent won the tournament, their third Twenty20 title.

Women's Super League

References

 2016
 
2016 in English sport